Tower  Pier may refer to:

Tower Millennium Pier, passenger boat service pier on the river Thames near the Tower of London, UK
Tower Lifeboat Station, formerly at Tower Millennium Pier, now next to Waterloo Bridge